The 2022 Dunedin local elections were held via postal voting between September and October 2022 as part of the wider 2022 New Zealand local elections. Elections in Dunedin covered one territorial authority, the Dunedin City Council, and six community boards.

Dunedin City Council
The Dunedin City Council used the single transferable voting system to elect the Mayor of Dunedin and city councillors for the 2022-2025 term. Voter turnout was 48.21%. The positions of mayor and fourteen city councillors elected at-large were contested by the following candidates:

Mayor

Former city councillor Jules Radich was returned as mayor, defeating incumbent Aaron Hawkins.

Incumbent candidate

Councillors

Withdrawn due to being elected as mayor
Incumbent candidate

Other local elections
Depending on where in Dunedin they lived, voters also voted in concurrent local elections for the:
Otago Regional Council:
Dunedin Constituency, or
Molyneux Constituency
and
Strath Taieri Community Board
Waikouaiti Coast Community Board
Mosgiel-Taieri Community Board
Saddle Hill Community Board
West Harbour Community Board, or
Otago Peninsula Community Board
and/or
Oamaru Licensing Trust.

References

Politics of Dunedin
Dunedin
Dunedin
Dunedin
2020s in Dunedin